The 14th Cannes Film Festival was held from 3 to 18 May 1961. The Palme d'Or went to the Une aussi longue absence, directed by Henri Colpi and Viridiana, directed by Luis Buñuel. The festival opened with Che gioia vivere, directed by René Clément.

The festival also screened Shirley Clarke's debut film The Connection due to the efforts of the French Syndicate of Cinema Critics. The success of the film caused the festival to create International Critics' Week the following year.

Jury

The following people were appointed as the Jury of the 1961 competition:

Feature films
Jean Giono (France) Jury President
Sergei Yutkevich (Soviet Union) Vice President
Pedro Armendáriz (Mexico)
Luigi Chiarini (Italy)
Tonino Delli Colli (Italy)
Claude Mauriac (France)
Edouard Molinaro (France)
Jean Paulhan (France) (author)
Raoul Ploquin (France)
Liselotte Pulver (Switzerland)
Fred Zinnemann (USA)

Short films
Ion Popescu-Gopo (Romania)
Pierre Prévert (France)
Jurgen Schildt (Sweden) (journalist)
Jean Vidal (France)
Jean Vivie (France) (CST official)

Feature film competition
The following feature films competed for the Palme d'Or:

The Brute (Dúvad) by Zoltán Fábri
Chronicle of Flaming Years (Povest plamennykh let) by Yuliya Solntseva
The Cossacks (Kazaki) by Vasili Pronin
Darclee by Mihai Iacob
The First Mass (A Primeira Missa) by Lima Barreto
The Fourteenth Day (Dan četrnaesti) by Zdravko Velimirović
Girl with a Suitcase (La Ragazza con la valigia) by Valerio Zurlini
Goodbye Again (Aimez-vous Brahms?) by Anatole Litvak
The Hand in the Trap (La Mano en la trampa) by Leopoldo Torre Nilsson
Her Brother (Otôto) by Kon Ichikawa
Hoodlum Priest by Irvin Kershner
I Like Mike by Peter Frye
The Joy of Living (Che gioia vivere) by René Clément
The Judge (Domaren) by Alf Sjöberg
The Knife (Het Mes) by Fons Rademakers
The Last Witness (Der Letzte Zeuge) by Wolfgang Staudte
The Long Absence (Une aussi longue absence) by Henri Colpi
The Lovemakers (La Viaccia) by Mauro Bolognini
Madalena by Dinos Dimopoulos
The Mark by Guy Green
Mother Joan of the Angels (Matka Joanna od aniolów) by Jerzy Kawalerowicz
The Passionate Demons (Line) by Nils Reinhardt Christensen
Plein sud by Gaston De Gerlache
A Raisin in the Sun by Daniel Petrie
Sky Above and Mud Beneath (Le Ciel et la boue) by Pierre-Dominique Gaisseau
A Song About the Gray Pigeon (Piesen o sivém holubovi) by Stanislav Barabáš
That Forward Center Died at Dawn (El Centroforward murió al amanecer) by René Múgica
Two Women (La Ciociara) by Vittorio De Sica
Viridiana by Luis Buñuel
The Wastrel (Il Relitto) by Michael Cacoyannis

Out of competition
The following film was selected to be screened out of competition:
Exodus by Otto Preminger

Short film competition
The following short films competed for the Short Film Palme d'Or:

Aicha by Noureddine Mechri and Francis Warin
Argentina paraiso de la pesca by Antonio Ber Ciani
The Art of Lee Hsiang-Fen by Henry T.C. Wang
Balgarski ansambal za narodni pesni i tanzi by Lada Boyadjieva
The Black Cat  by Robert Braverman
Cattle Ranch by Guy L. Coté
Children of the Sun by John Hubley and Faith Hubley
The Creation of Woman by Charles F. Schwep
Cyrus le grand by Feri Farzaneh
The Do-It-Yourself Cartoon Kit
Dog Barbos and Unusual Cross by Leonid Gaidai
Fantazie pro levou ruku a lidske svedomi by Pavel Hobl
Le Festival de Baalbeck 1960 by David McDonald
Folkwangschulen by Herbert Vesely
Foroyar by Jørgen Roos
Fuego en Castilla (Tactilvisión del páramo del espanto) by José Val del Omar
Giovedi: passeggiata by Vincenzo Gamna
Gorod bolshoy sudby by Ilya Kopalin
House of Hashimoto by Connie Rasinski
Hudozhnikat Zlatyu Boyadzhiev by Ivan Popov
Kangra et kulu by N.S. Thapa
Na vez by Branko Kalacic
Nebbia by Raffaele Andreassi
Paul Valéry by Roger Leenhardt
Párbaj by Gyula Macskássy
La Petite Cuillère by Carlos Vilardebó
Robert Frost by Sidney J. Stiber
Souvenirs from Sweden by Henning Carlsen
Taketori Monogatari  by Kazuhiko Watanabe
W kręgu ciszy by Jerzy Ziarnik

Awards

Official awards
The following films and people received the 1961 awards: 
Palme d'Or: 
The Long Absence (Une aussi longue absence) by Henri Colpi
Viridiana by Luis Buñuel
Prix spécial du Jury: Mother Joan of the Angels (Matka Joanna od aniolów) by Jerzy Kawalerowicz
Best Director: Yuliya Solntseva for Chronicle of Flaming Years (Povest plamennykh let)
Best Actress: Sophia Loren for Two Women (La Ciociara)
Best Actor: Anthony Perkins for Goodbye Again (Aimez-vous Brahms?)
Short films
Short Film Palme d'Or: La Petite Cuillère by Carlos Vilardebó
Jury Prize - Best Short Film: Párbaj by Gyula Macskássy
Short film Technical Prize - Special mention: Folkwangschulen by Herbert Vesely & Fuego en Castilla (Tactilvisión del páramo del espanto) by José Val del Omar

Independent awards
FIPRESCI
 FIPRESCI Prize: The Hand in the Trap (La Mano en la trampa) by Leopoldo Torre Nilsson
Commission Supérieure Technique
 Technical Grand Prize - Feature film Special Mention:
Her Brother (Otôto) by Kon Ichikawa
Chronicle of Flaming Years (Povest plamennykh let) by Yuliya Solntseva
OCIC Award
 Hoodlum Priest by Irvin Kershner
Other awards
Gary Cooper Award: A Raisin in the Sun by Daniel Petrie

References

Media
Institut National de l'Audiovisuel: Opening of the 1961 festival (commentary in French)
INA: Eventful climbing of the steps at the 1961 Cannes Festival (commentary in French)
INA: Sidney Poitier on the question of race (1961) (commentary in French)

External links 
1961 Cannes Film Festival (web.archive)
Official website Retrospective 1961 
Cannes Film Festival:1961  at Internet Movie Database

Cannes Film Festival, 1961
Cannes Film Festival, 1961
Cannes Film Festival